Vitreorana gorzulae (Bolivar giant glass frog) is a species of frog in the family Centrolenidae. It is found in Bolívar state in Venezuela and in Guyana. In Spanish it is known as ranita de cristal de Gorzula.
Its natural habitats are subtropical or tropical moist montane forests, rivers, and intermittent rivers.

References

gorzulae
Amphibians of Guyana
Amphibians of Venezuela
Taxonomy articles created by Polbot
Amphibians described in 1992